Silabkhvor-e Pain (also Romanized as Sīlābkhvor-e Pā’īn; also known as Seilabkhor Sofla, Seylābkhvor-e Soflá, Sīlākhor-e Soflá, and Sīlākhor Soflá) is a village in Hotkan Rural District, in the Central District of Zarand County, Kerman Province, Iran. At the 2006 census, its population was 49, in 12 families.

References 

Populated places in Zarand County